Kose (Estonian for "Falls"; also known as Pirita-Kose) is a subdistrict of the district of Pirita in Tallinn, the capital of Estonia. It has a population of 3,351.

Gallery

See also
Pirita River
Pirita-Kose-Kloostrimetsa Circuit
Tallinn Botanic Garden

References

Subdistricts of Tallinn